Ma Wu  courtesy name Zizhang, was a Chinese general during the Eastern Han, who hailed from the Huyang Town, Tanghe, located in the Henan province. He was ranked 15th among the 28 Generals of Yuntai. He appeared as a figure in the Book of the Later Han and sometimes deified as a door god in Taoist pantheon, together with Yao Qi. He is also linked to a star deity called Kui Mulang.

In battle, he used the halberd and a steel mace. After joining future Emperor Liu Xiu's rebellion, Ma Wu began to fight hard for his country. He was the only person who hated the incumbent evil rulers of his time. He wanted to see his country prosper, and saw Liu Xiu as the man who could make it happen. He was a brave, strong and capable military strategist of his time.

References

61 deaths
Chinese gods
Deified Chinese people